Chionodes consona is a moth in the family Gelechiidae. It is found in Peru.

The wingspan is about 13 mm. The forewings are dark purplish-fuscous with a thick white streak along the dorsum from the base to three-fourths, irregularly terminated and uniting with a roundish white spot in the disc beyond the middle of the wing. There is also a roundish white spot on the costa at three-fourths. The hindwings are grey.

References

Chionodes
Moths described in 1917
Moths of South America